SR9011 is a research drug that was developed by Professor Thomas Burris of Scripps as an agonist of Rev-ErbAα
with a half-maximum inhibitory concentration (IC50) = 790 nM for Rev-Erbα and IC50 = 560 nM for Rev-ErbAβ. It has been used in the study of the regulation of the circadian rhythm and its links to immune system function, inflammation and cancer.

See also 
 GSK-4112
 GW501516
 Nidufexor
 SR8278
 SR9009

References 

Amines
Benzene derivatives
Experimental drugs
Thiophenes